Lyropupa hawaiiensis is a species of air-breathing land snail, terrestrial pulmonate gastropod mollusk in the family Pupillidae. This species is endemic to the United States.

References

Endemic fauna of the United States
Molluscs of Hawaii
Lyropupa
Gastropods described in 1904
Taxa named by César Marie Félix Ancey
Taxonomy articles created by Polbot